Chang Yun-cheng is a Taiwanese politician. He was the Political Deputy Minister of Culture from 2012 to 2013.

MOC Political Deputy Ministry

Appointment
Chang was appointed to the position of Political Deputy Minister during the inauguration ceremony of the establishment of the ROC Ministry of Culture (MOC) on 21 May 2012 from its predecessor Council for Cultural Affairs.

Resignation
Chang resigned from his position on 4 July 2013 due to health-related reason.

See also
 Executive Yuan
 Culture of Taiwan

References

Living people
Taiwanese Ministers of Culture
Year of birth missing (living people)